USS LST-936 was an  in the United States Navy. Like many of her class, she was not named and is properly referred to by her hull designation.

Construction
LST-936 was laid down on 7 July 1944, at Hingham, Massachusetts, by the Bethlehem-Hingham Shipyard; launched on 9 August 1944; sponsored by Miss Dorothy M. Wadman; and commissioned on 1 September 1944.

Service history
During World War II, LST-936 was assigned to the Asiatic-Pacific theater and participated in  the Mindanao Island landings in March and April 1945.

Upon her return to the United States, she was decommissioned on 17 May 1946, and struck from the Navy list on 5 June, that same year. On 12 June 1948, the ship was sold to the Walter W. Johnson Co., for scrapping.

Awards
LST-936 earned one battle star for World War II service.

Notes

Citations

Bibliography 

Online resources

External links
 

 

LST-542-class tank landing ships
World War II amphibious warfare vessels of the United States
Ships built in Hingham, Massachusetts
1944 ships